Kids' WB (stylized as Kids' WB!) was an American children's programming service and brand of The WB that aired on the network from September 9, 1995, to September 16, 2006. The block moved to The CW (a result of the merger of Time Warner's The WB and CBS Corporation's UPN), where it aired from September 23, 2006, to May 17, 2008. After the block was discontinued, its Saturday morning programming slot was sold to 4Kids Entertainment and replaced by its successor block, The CW4Kids (later renamed Toonzai).

An online network version of Kids' WB launched on April 28, 2008, but closed on May 17, 2015. The service allowed viewers to stream content, such as Looney Tunes, Hanna-Barbera, and DC Comics. The website operated in different "zones" based on programming type: Kids' WB, Kids' WB Jr. (for shows aimed at younger children), and DC HeroZone (for action-oriented animated series). It was also available on Fancast, where it featured Looney Tunes shorts and full episodes of television series such as Scooby-Doo, The Flintstones, and The Jetsons.

History

1995–1999: Early years
Kids' WB launched in the United States on September 9, 1995, striving to compete against the dominance of Fox Kids at the time, and airing on Saturday mornings from 8:00 to 11:00 a.m. and Monday through Fridays from 4:00 p.m. to 5:00 p.m. The block was structured to air in all time zones, airing on a tape delay outside of the Eastern Time Zone to adjust the recommended airtime of the block to each zone. However, during its first five years, an exact timeslot was not announced on-air, leaving viewers to check their local WB station listings; since the programs had different airtimes depending on the local WB affiliate schedule in the market. On September 7, 1996, the Saturday block was extended by one hour, airing from 8:00 a.m. to Noon Eastern Time.

Although Kids' WB aired on almost all of The WB's affiliated stations (including those later affiliated with The WB 100+ Station Group), the network's Chicago affiliate WGN-TV – owned by The WB's co-parent, the Tribune Company – declined to carry the weekday and Saturday blocks. Instead, it opted to air its weekday and Saturday morning newscasts, (the first incarnation of the latter was canceled in 1998), another locally-produced programming (such as The Bozo Super Sunday Show) in the morning hours, and syndicated programming in the afternoons. Kids' WB programming instead aired on WCIU-TV. However, WGN's superstation feed carried the block from 1995 to 1999, making the network available to markets without a local affiliate. WGN-TV began clearing Kids' WB on its Chicago broadcast signal in 2004, taking over the local rights from WCIU-TV.

On September 1, 1997, a weekday morning block was added from 7:00 a.m. to 8:00 a.m. and the weekday afternoon block was extended by one hour, running from 3:00 p.m. to 5:00 p.m. However, WGN's superstation feed, as well as some WB affiliates, had to wait until the next day, as they preempted the blocks to carry The Jerry Lewis MDA Labor Day Telethon. Some WB affiliates (such as WPIX in New York City, KTLA in Los Angeles and KWGN-TV in Denver, Colorado) aired the weekday morning block in conjunction with the weekday afternoon block, extending it to three hours, running from 2:00 p.m. to 5:00 p.m. On the same date, the block received an on-air rebranding – which included a revised logo and graphics package centered upon the Warner Bros. Studios lot theme that was also used in promotions for The WB's primetime programming during the network's first eight years on the air – which was developed by Riverstreet Productions, and lasted until 2005.

1999–2006: Introduction of anime
On February 13, 1999, Kids' WB made a breakthrough when the English dub of the anime series Pokémon by 4Kids Entertainment moved to the network from broadcast syndication. It became a major hit for the programming block, helping it beat Fox Kids with its animated lineup backed by Warner Bros. Other anime shows aired on Kids' WB in later years, such as Cardcaptors, Yu-Gi-Oh!, Astro Boy, MegaMan NT Warrior, and Viewtiful Joe.

In July 2001, Kids' WB's weekday afternoon lineup was rebranded as Toonami on Kids' WB, extending the Cartoon Network action-animated block Toonami to broadcast television, and bringing shows such as Sailor Moon, Dragon Ball Z, and The Powerpuff Girls to broadcast network television. However, the sub-block was critically panned by industry observers, who noticed that the action branding of the block - which had added shows such as Generation O!, Scooby-Doo, and The Nightmare Room, a live-action series created by Goosebumps author R. L. Stine - did not translate content-wise. And while the cross promotion between Cartoon Network and Kids' WB did allow for series to be shared between the networks, most of these only lasted a short period of time. This included Dragon Ball Z and Sailor Moon appearing on Toonami on Kids' WB for only two weeks, and Cardcaptors appearing on the main Toonami block on Cartoon Network for only two weeks. In spring 2002, Kids' WB announced that they would drop the Toonami name from their weekday lineup, once again making the Toonami brand exclusive to Cartoon Network.

On September 3, 2001, the Kids' WB weekday morning block was discontinued, with The WB giving that slot back to its local affiliates to carry locally-produced shows, syndicated programming and/or infomercials.

On May 31, 2005, The WB announced that the weekday afternoon Kids' WB block would be discontinued "at the request of the local affiliates," as it became financially unattractive due to the fact broadcast stations perceived that children's programming viewership on afternoon timeslots had gravitated more towards cable networks – these stations began to target more adult audiences with talk shows and sitcom reruns in the daytime. Kids' WB's weekday programming continued, but with redundant programming and theme weeks until December 30, 2005 (the block began to increasingly promote Cartoon Network, their afternoon Miguzi block, Hi Hi Puffy AmiYumi, and the Kids' WB Saturday morning lineup during the transition). The weekday afternoon Kids' WB block aired for the last time on December 30, 2005, and was replaced on January 2, 2006, by "Daytime WB", a more adult-targeted general entertainment block featuring repeats of sitcoms and drama series formerly seen on the major networks. As a result, the Saturday morning Kids' WB lineup that remained was extended by one hour on January 7, 2006, running from 7:00 a.m. to noon, no longer affected by time zone variances.

2006–2008: Move to The CW and closure
On January 24, 2006, Warner Bros. Television (producer of Kids' WB and owner of the block's original broadcaster from 1995 to 2006, The WB) and CBS Corporation (owner of UPN and subsidiary of National Amusements who also owns film studio Paramount Pictures' parent company Viacom) announced that they would merge both The WB and UPN and into The CW, which would primarily air programs aired by its two soon-to-be predecessor networks as part of its initial lineup. The combined network utilized The WB's scheduling practices (inheriting the 30-hour weekly programming schedule that the network utilized at the time of the announcement) and brought the Kids' WB block, still run by Warner Bros. Television and maintaining the same name, to the new lineup (The CW's decision to use The WB's scheduling model was mainly due to the fact that it included children's and daytime programming blocks that were not offered by UPN, which had not aired any children's programming since the Disney's One Too block was discontinued in August 2003). Notably, during this time AOL-then a sister company to Warner Bros.-was the main sponsor of CBS' own Saturday morning block KOL Secret Slumber Party, but at no point did neither Kids' WB nor SSP advertise each other's programs-most likely because SSP was produced and operated by DIC Entertainment and was aimed at girls, as opposed to the boy-centric Kids' WB.

On October 2, 2007, The CW announced that it would discontinue the Kids' WB programming block through a joint decision between corporate parents Time Warner and CBS Corporation, due to the effects of children's advertising limits and cable competition; the network also announced that it would sell the five-hour Saturday programming slot to 4Kids Entertainment. The Kids' WB block aired for the final time on May 17, 2008 (for some stations that aired the block on a day-behind basis, the block's last airdate was on May 18, 2008).

On May 24, 2008, 4Kids launched The CW4Kids in place of Kids' WB. The lineup for the block consisted of 4Kids-produced shows, such as Chaotic, as well as new seasons of Yu-Gi-Oh! and Teenage Mutant Ninja Turtles. The official site, TheCW4Kids.com, officially launched on April 20, 2008. The block was renamed Toonzai on August 14, 2010, it was replaced by Vortexx (programmed by Saban Brands) on August 25, 2012, and it continued to air until it ended on September 27, 2014; the block that currently airs on The CW is One Magnificent Morning, which debuted on October 4, 2014.

2008–present: Online networks
On April 28, 2008, Warner Bros. Entertainment announced that The WB and Kids' WB brands would be relaunched as online networks, with the Kids' WB network consisting of five subchannels: Kids' WB! (for WB shows for kids and families), Kids' WB! Jr. (for shows for younger children), Scooby-Doo, Looney Tunes, and two different websites of DC Kids: DC HeroZone.com and DC Beyond.com (for action-oriented animated shows for DC fans). After the dissolution of In2TV, the Kids' WB online portal absorbed most of that service's children's programming. The service was significantly scaled back in 2013, with most of the archival content being removed. The archival content can be easily accessed through the Internet Archive's Wayback Machine.

The site was split into 3 websites on May 17, 2015. These sites are: DCKids.com, LooneyTunes.com and ScoobyDoo.com. All three are grouped into WB Kids Sites. The decision to split the site into three ended, after almost twenty years, the use of the "Kids' WB!" brand name. Also, the WB Kids Sites got new YouTube channels: WB Kids for main Warner Bros. properties, and DC Kids for DC Comics properties. In July 2016, 2 of the 3 websites re-merged into "WBKids GO!". DCKids.com remains active.

Programming

References

External links

 WBKids GO!
 DC Kids
 Kids' WB TV Block on retrojunk
 Platypuscomix's tribute to KidsWB

Television programming blocks in the United States
 
Windows games
1995 American television series debuts
2008 American television series endings
Internet properties established in 2008
Internet properties disestablished in 2015
Children's television networks in the United States
The CW
The WB
Warner Bros. Discovery brands
Television channels and stations established in 1995
Television channels and stations disestablished in 2008